Telesforo de Monzón y Ortiz de Urruela (1 December 1904 in Bergara, Spain – 9 March 1981 in Bayonne, France) was a writer, politician and nationalist Basque leader.

Monzón was an important leader of the Basque Nationalist Party during the Second Republic and the Spanish Civil War. After the end of the war, he was forced into exile for more than 40 years. After returning to the Basque region south of the Pyrenees, he became a major figure in the movement for Basque independence and was one of the founders of the coalition Herri Batasuna. At the 1979 General Election he was elected to the Spanish Congress of Deputies representing Gipuzkoa Province, the same district which he had represented from 1932 to 1936 during the Spanish Second Republic. He served until March 1980 when he resigned from the parliament. In the 1980 Basque regional election he was elected to the Basque parliament. He died in March 1981 and was buried in his native Bergara.

References

Sources
 Sudupe, Pako 2011: 50eko hamarkadako euskal literatura II. Kazetaritza eta saiakera, Donostia, Utriusque Vasconiae. 

1904 births
1981 deaths
People from Bergara
Basque writers
Herri Batasuna politicians
Members of the 1st Basque Parliament
Members of the 1st Congress of Deputies (Spain)
Members of the Congress of Deputies of the Second Spanish Republic
Exiles of the Spanish Civil War in France